Reynaldo Cesar Moraes (born 3 January 1997) is a Brazilian footballer who plays as defender for Cruzeiro.

Career statistics

References

External links

1997 births
Living people
Brazilian footballers
Campeonato Brasileiro Série A players
Campeonato Brasileiro Série B players
Campeonato Brasileiro Série C players
Primeira Liga players
Associação Atlética Ponte Preta players
Tombense Futebol Clube players
Esporte Clube Juventude players
Goiás Esporte Clube players
Cruzeiro Esporte Clube players
Moreirense F.C. players
Association football defenders
Brazilian expatriate footballers
Expatriate footballers in Portugal
Footballers from São Paulo (state)